The 9th Infantry Brigade was a formation of the Royal Hungarian Army that participated in the Axis invasion of Yugoslavia during World War II.

Commanders
 Brigadier General Jánas Székely  (23 Jan 1939 - 1 Aug 1941)
 Brigadier General Imre Széchy (1 Aug 1941 - 17 Feb 1942)

Notes

References

 

Military units and formations of Hungary in World War II